The regulative principle of worship is a Christian doctrine, held by some Calvinists and Anabaptists, that God commands churches to conduct public services of worship using certain distinct elements affirmatively found in scripture, and conversely, that God prohibits any and all other practices in public worship. The doctrine further determines these affirmed elements to be those set forth in scripture by express commands or examples, or if not expressed, those which are implied logically by good and necessary consequence. The regulative principle thus provides a governing concept of worship as obedience to God, identifies the set of specific practical elements constituting obedient worship, and identifies and excludes disobedient practices.

Overview
The regulative principle of worship is held, practiced, and vigorously maintained by conservative Reformed churches, the Restoration Movement, and other conservative Protestant denominations. Historic confessional standards stating the doctrine include the Westminster Confession of Faith, the Heidelberg Catechism, the Belgic Confession, and the London Baptist Confession of Faith.

The regulative principle contrasts with the normative principle of worship, which teaches that whatever is not prohibited in scripture is permitted in worship, as long as it is agreeable to the peace and unity of the Church. In short, there must be agreement with the general practice of the Church and no prohibition in scripture for whatever is done in worship.

A broader sense of the term "regulative principle" is occasionally cited on matters other than worship, for example, to constrain designs of church government to scriptural elements. The regulative principle is often confused with the doctrine of sola scriptura, which states that the scriptures are the only infallible spiritual authority, but is compatible with and taught by many churches which follow the normative principle of worship.

Interpretations
The regulative principle is characteristic of Calvin's thought: basing his approach in the Sola Scriptura key Reformation principle, he removes from church service order any element not explicitly mentioned in the Bible in order to avoid any risk of compromise with the sacred tradition - which was promoted as a second source of dogma by the Roman Catholic Church; he for instance associates musical instruments with icons, which he considered violations of the Ten Commandments' prohibition of graven images. On this basis, many early Calvinists also eschewed musical instruments and advocated exclusive psalmody in worship.

In 17th-century English church debates, the Puritans argued that there was a divine pattern to be followed at all times, which they called the ius divinum ("divine law", after a Latin term in the ancient Roman religion). This came to be known by the milder term "regulative principle" in English.

Those who oppose instruments in worship, such as Orthodox Presbyterian Church ministers John Murray and G. I. Williamson, argue first that there is no example of the use of musical instruments for worship in the New Testament and second that the Old Testament uses of instruments in worship were specifically tied to the ceremonial laws of the Temple in Jerusalem, which they take to be abrogated for the Church. Since the 1800s, however, most of the Reformed churches have modified their understanding of the regulative principle and make use of musical instruments, believing that Calvin and his early followers went beyond the biblical requirements of the Decalogue and that such things are circumstances of worship requiring biblically rooted wisdom, rather than an explicit command. The vast majority of Reformed churches today accordingly make use of hymns and musical instruments, and many also employ contemporary worship music styles and worship bands. A minority of Reformed churches, however — such as the Free Presbyterian Church of Scotland and the churches of the Reformed Presbyterian communion—continue to interpret the regulative principle and scriptural evidence as permitting only unaccompanied psalmody in worship.

The regulative principle was historically taken to prohibit the use of dance in worship. In 1996 reformed theologian John Frame broke the consensus and argued that the regulative principle does permit dancing, a view that was criticised by more conservative scholars.

While music is the central issue in worship debates, other matters have been contentious as well, including doxologies, benedictions, corporate confession of sin, prayer and the readings of creeds or portions of scripture. The presence of any one of these, their order and priority have ranged over various denominations.

John Calvin's liturgy

The original Lord's Day service designed by John Calvin was a highly liturgical service with the Creed, Alms, Confession and Absolution, the Lord's supper, Doxologies, prayers, Psalms, the Lords prayer, Benedictions. The following are Orders of Service for the Lord's Day as designed by John Calvin (Collect is a short prayer; Lection is a scripture reading; Fraction and Delivery are the breaking of the bread and distribution thereof, respectively):

See also 

 Normative principle of worship

References

Further reading

 

 
  
 

Calvinist theology
Protestant worship and liturgy